Naqib Deh (also Romanized as Naqīb Deh) is a village in Tangeh Soleyman Rural District, Kolijan Rostaq District, Sari County, Mazandaran Province, Iran. At the 2006 census, its population was 113, in 31 families.

References 

Populated places in Sari County